Wyckoff-Snediker Family Cemetery is a historic cemetery located in the Woodhaven section of the New York City borough of Queens. It is located behind St. Matthew's Episcopal Church which closed in 2011. All Saints Congregation undertook renovations which were completed in 2018. It has grave markers that denote burials dating from 1793 to 1892.  The cemetery includes 136 members of the Wyckoff and Snediker families, as well as other local Dutch families.

It was listed on the National Register of Historic Places in 2001.

References

External links
 

Cemeteries on the National Register of Historic Places in New York City
Cemeteries in Queens, New York
Woodhaven, Queens
National Register of Historic Places in Queens, New York
Wyckoff family